Halloween costumes are costumes worn on Halloween, a festival which falls on October 31. An early reference to wearing costumes at Halloween comes from Scotland in 1585, but they may pre-date this. There are many references to the custom during the 18th and 19th centuries in the Celtic countries of Scotland, Ireland, Mann and Wales. It has been suggested that the custom comes from the Celtic festivals of Samhain and Calan Gaeaf, or from the practise of "souling" during the Christian observance of Allhallowtide. The Christian tradition of acknowledging the danse macabre is also suggested as the origin of dressing up on Halloween  Dressing up is not strictly restricted to Halloween among Christians, with similar practices being observed on holidays like Christmas. Halloween costumes are traditionally based on frightening supernatural or folkloric beings. However, by the 1930s costumes based on characters in mass media such as film, literature, and radio were popular. Halloween costumes have tended to be worn mainly by young people, but since the mid-20th century they have been increasingly worn by adults also.

History of Halloween costumes

The wearing of costumes at Halloween may come from the belief that supernatural beings, or the souls of the dead, roamed the earth at this time.
The practice may have originated in a Celtic festival, held on 31 October  to mark the beginning of winter. It was called Samhain in Ireland, Scotland and the Isle of Man, and Calan Gaeaf in Wales, Cornwall and Brittany. The festival is believed to have pre-Christian roots. After the Christianization of Ireland in the 5th century, some of these customs may have been retained in the Christian observance of All Hallows' Eve in that region—which continued to be called Samhain/Calan Gaeaf—blending the traditions of their ancestors with Christian ones. It was seen as a liminal time, when the spirits or fairies (the Aos Sí), and the souls of the dead, could more easily come into our world. It was believed that the Aos Sí needed to be propitiated to ensure that the people and their livestock survived the winter.

From at least the 16th century, the festival included mumming and guising, which involved people going house-to-house in costume (or in disguise), usually reciting verses or songs in exchange for food. It may have originally been a tradition whereby people impersonated the Aos Sí, or the souls of the dead, and received offerings on their behalf. Impersonating these beings, or wearing a disguise, was also believed to protect oneself from them. It is suggested that the mummers and guisers "personify the old spirits of the winter, who demanded reward in exchange for good fortune". F. Marian McNeill suggests the ancient pagan festival included people wearing masks or costumes to represent the spirits, and that faces were marked (or blackened) with ashes taken from the sacred bonfire. In parts of southern Ireland, a man dressed as a Láir Bhán (white mare) led youths house-to-house reciting verses—some of which had pagan overtones—in exchange for food. If the household donated food it could expect good fortune from the 'Muck Olla'; not doing so would bring misfortune. In 19th century England , youths went house-to-house with masked, painted or blackened faces, often threatening to do mischief if they were not welcomed. In parts of Wales, men went about dressed as fearsome beings called gwrachod, while in some places, young people cross-dressed.  Elsewhere in Europe, mumming and costumes were part of other yearly festivals. However, in the Celtic-speaking regions they were "particularly appropriate to a night upon which supernatural beings were said to be abroad and could be imitated or warded off by human wanderers".

It has also been suggested that the wearing of Halloween costumes developed from the custom of souling, which was practised by Christians in parts of Western Europe from at least the 15th century. At Allhallowtide, groups of poor people would go door-to-door, collecting soul cakes – either as representatives of the dead, or in return for saying prayers for them. One 19th century English writer said it "used to consist of parties of children, dressed up in fantastic costume, who went round to the farm houses and cottages, singing a song, and begging for cakes (spoken of as "Soal-cakes"), apples, money, or anything that the goodwives would give them". The soulers typically asked for "mercy on all Christian souls for a soul cake". The practice was mentioned by Shakespeare his play The Two Gentlemen of Verona (1593). Christian minister Prince Sorie Conteh wrote on the wearing of costumes: "It was traditionally believed that the souls of the departed wandered the earth until All Saints' Day, and All Hallows' Eve provided one last chance for the dead to gain vengeance on their enemies before moving to the next world. In order to avoid being recognised by any soul that might be seeking such vengeance, people would don masks or costumes to disguise their identities". In the Middle Ages, statues and relics of martyred saints were paraded through the streets at Allhallowtide. Some churches who could not afford these things had people dress as saints instead. Some believers continue the practice of dressing as saints, biblical figures, and reformers in Halloween celebrations today. Many Christians in continental Europe, especially in France, believed that on Halloween "the dead of the churchyards rose for one wild, hideous carnival," known as the danse macabre, which has often been depicted in church decoration. An article published by Christianity Today claimed the danse macabre was enacted at village pageants and at court masques, with people "dressing up as corpses from various strata of society", and suggested this was the origin of Halloween costume parties.

The custom of guising at Halloween in North America is first recorded in 1911, where a newspaper in Kingston, Ontario reported children going "guising" around the neighborhood. In 19th century America, Halloween was often celebrated with costume parades and "licentious revelries". However, efforts were made to "domesticate" the festival to conform with Victorian era morality.  Halloween was made into a private rather than public holiday, celebrations involving liquor and sensuality de-emphasized, and only children were expected to celebrate the festival. Early Halloween costumes emphasized the gothic nature of Halloween, and were aimed primarily at children. Costumes were also made at home, or using items (such as make-up) which could be purchased and utilized to create a costume.  But in the 1930s, A.S. Fishbach, Ben Cooper, Inc., and other firms began mass-producing Halloween costumes for sale in stores as trick-or-treating became popular in North America. Halloween costumes are often designed to imitate supernatural and scary beings. Costumes are traditionally those of monsters such as vampires, werewolves, zombies, ghosts, skeletons, witches, goblins, trolls, devils, etc. or in more recent years such science fiction-inspired characters as aliens and superheroes. There are also costumes of pop culture figures like presidents, athletes, celebrities, or characters in film, television, literature, etc. Another popular trend is for women (and in some cases, men) to use Halloween as an excuse to wear sexy or revealing costumes, showing off more skin than would be socially acceptable otherwise. Young girls also often dress as entirely non-scary characters at Halloween, including princesses, fairies, angels, cute animals and flowers. 
Halloween costume parties generally take place on or around October 31, often on the Friday or Saturday prior to the holiday. Halloween parties are the 3rd most popular type of party held in Western countries, falling behind only to Super Bowl & New Year's Eve parties.

Economics of Halloween costumes
 Researchers conducted a survey for the National Retail Federation in the United States and found that 53.3 percent of consumers planned to buy a costume for Halloween 2005, spending $38.11 on average (up $10 from the year before). They were also expected to spend $4.96 billion in 2006, up significantly from just $3.3 billion the previous year.  The troubled economy has caused many Americans to cut back on Halloween spending.  In 2009, the National Retail Federation anticipated that American households would decrease Halloween spending by as much as 15% to $56.31. In 2013, Americans spent an estimated $6.9 billion to celebrate Halloween, including a predicted $2.6 billion on costumes (with more spent on adult costumes than for children's costumes) and $330 million on pet costumes. In 2017 it was estimated that Americans would spend $9.1 billion on Halloween merchandise with $3.4 billion of that being on spend on Halloween costumes. Another survey by NRF showed that 67% of Halloween shoppers would buy Halloween costumes spending $3.2 billion in 2019. It is estimated that the Halloween spending in 2022 could reach $10.6 billion.

Politics of Halloween costumes

Halloween costumes in the contemporary Western world sometimes depict people and things from present times and are sometimes read in terms of their political and cultural significance. Halloween costumes are sometimes denounced for cultural appropriation when they uncritically use stereotypical representations of other groups of people such as gypsies and Native Americans. Immigration and Customs Enforcement Secretary Julie Myers was involved in a scandal when she awarded "Best Costume" at the ICE Halloween party to an 'escaped Jamaican prisoner' dressed in dreadlocks and blackface.

See also
 Ben Cooper, Inc.
 Gothic fashion
 Fetish fashion
 Punk fashion
 Cosplay

References

Bibliography
Addis, M.E. Leicester. "Allhallowtide." Frank Leslie's Popular Monthly. 40:5 (November 1895).
Dunwich, Gerina. A Witch's Halloween. Avon, Mass.: Adams Media, 2007.
Denny, Dann. "Adults go for sexy or funny looks on Halloween." Herald-Times, (Bloomington, IN) 28 Oct. 2010: Newspaper Source Plus. Web. 9 Feb. 2013.
Dowling, Melissa. "Sexy Sells Halloween Costumes." Multichannel Merchant 6.10 (2010): 56. Business Source Complete. Web. 9 Feb. 2013.
"Halloween." In Encyclopedia of the End: Mysterious Death in Fact, Fancy, Folklore, and More. Deborah Noyes, ed. Boston: Houghton Mifflin Co., 2008.
Levinson, Stacey, Stacey Mack, Dan Reinhardt, and Helen Suarez, Grace Yeh (1992)
"Halloween As a Consumption Experience", in NA - Advances in Consumer Research, Volume 19, eds. John F. Sherry, Jr. and Brian Sternthal, Provo, UT : Association for Consumer Research, Pages: 219-228.
Lherm, Adrien. "Halloween — A 'Reinvented' Holiday." In Celebrating Ethnicity and Nation: American Festive Culture From the Revolution to the Early Twentieth Century. Geneviève Fabre, ed. New York: Berghahn Books, 2001.
Nelson, Adie. "The Pink Dragon Is Female." Psychology Of Women Quarterly 24.2 (2000): 137. Academic Search Complete. Web. 9 Feb. 2013.
Northrup, Lesley A. Women and Religious Ritual. Washington, D.C.: Pastoral Press, 1993.
Ogletree, Shirley Matile, and Larry Denton. "Age And Gender Differences In Children's
Halloween Costumes." Journal of Psychology 127.6 (1993): 633. Business Source Complete. Web. 9 Feb. 2013.
Rogers, Nicholas. Halloween: From Pagan Ritual to Party Night. New York: Oxford University Press, 2002.
Seltzer, Sarah. "Embracing Our Inner Monsters." The New York Times [New York] 28 Oct. 2012: n. pag. Print.

Further reading
 Galembo, Phyllis. Dressed for Thrills: 100 Years of Halloween Costumes and Masquerade. New York: Harry N. Abrams, 2002.

External links

Santino, Jack. "The Fantasy and Folklore of All Hallows", The American Folklife Center, 2009

 
costume